Roger Winter is an American artist, teacher and writer.

Early life and education
He was born August 17, 1934, in Denison, Texas, the youngest of eight children. Winter was the first in his large original family to attend college. In 1952 he left Denison to study art at the University of Texas in Austin. After earning a Bachelor of Fine Arts and serving two years in the U.S. Army, he moved to Iowa City, Iowa to earn an MFA in painting from the University of Iowa. He then applied for and received a Max Beckmann Memorial Scholarship for study at the Brooklyn Museum School in New York.

Career
As a painter, Winter has explored many approaches to balancing illusion and abstraction in his work. Winter’s recent work shows the influence of his daily experience of architecture and ongoing construction in New York. His time spent in the minimal landscapes of New Mexico and Iceland has simplified his painted edges and divisions of canvas space. Winter's painterly brush work and his belief in the importance of luminosity appear to be surviving elements from the past.

Winter taught painting and drawing for 10 years at the now defunct art school of the Dallas Museum of Fine Art. While living in Dallas, he also taught from 1963 to 1989 at Southern Methodist University’s (SMU’s) Meadows School of The Arts.

Winter currently shows his work at Gerald Peters Contemporary in Santa Fe, New Mexico and Kirk Hopper’s Gallery of Fine Art in Dallas, Texas.

Gallery

Personal life

Winter is married to children’s book author and illustrator, Jeanette (Ragner) Winter. They currently live and maintain studios in New York City. Their two sons, Jonah Winter and Max Winter, are both professional writers.

References

External links 

 
 A Conversation with artist Roger Winter at the 2019 CASETA Symposium

Living people
1934 births
People from Denison, Texas
University of Texas at Austin College of Fine Arts alumni
United States Army soldiers
University of Iowa alumni
Painters from New York City
21st-century American male artists
20th-century American male artists
21st-century American painters
20th-century American painters
Painters from Texas
Artists from Dallas
Southern Methodist University faculty